Nicole Lynn Mitchell (born October 10, 1974) is an American television meteorologist, Air Force veteran, and politician serving in the Minnesota Senate. Mitchell is a Lieutenant Colonel in the Air National Guard, commanding the 126th Weather Flight.  She previously served in the U.S. Air Force Reserve, assigned to the 53rd Weather Reconnaissance Squadron at Keesler Air Force Base, Mississippi, as an aerial reconnaissance weather officer.  She worked at the Weather Channel from 2004 to 2011 and with Al Jazeera America from 2013 to 2016.  After some time as a freelance meteorologist at CBS News (working at WCBS-TV in New York City and WFOR-TV in Miami), she returned home to Minnesota to become a meteorologist for KSTP-TV in Minneapolis-St. Paul starting in June 2017.

In 2022, she was elected to the Minnesota Legislature as a state senator for District 47.

The Weather Channel
Mitchell was brought on by the Weather Channel in July 2004. From 2004 to 2008 she co-anchored TWC's morning show, Your Weather Today. She then moved to co-host of Evening Edition alongside Paul Goodloe from 2008 to 2010.

In January 2011, the Weather Channel terminated Mitchell. Mitchell filed a lawsuit against the Weather Channel in the United States District Court for the Northern District of Georgia in 2011, alleging that she had been terminated because the new owners disapproved of the time required by her simultaneous duties as a captain in the U.S. Air Force Reserve as part of the "Hurricane Hunters" team.

Al Jazeera America
In July 2013 it was announced that Mitchell would be part of the weather team at Al Jazeera America. Mitchell delivered the weather segments in the morning from 7 am to 9 am Eastern and during large weather events.

She was the chief meteorologist of the channel until it ceased operation on April 12, 2016.

CBS News
Beginning Spring 2016, Mitchell freelanced with CBS News, appearing on WCBS-TV in New York City, along with contributions to the national network CBS This Morning show. She also traveled south to Miami, filling in for Lissette Gonzalez at WFOR-TV while she was on maternity leave.

KSTP Minneapolis-St. Paul
KSTP-TV 5 Eyewitness News welcomed Nicole Mitchell in June 2017. She often appears on a variety of KSTP newscasts as a freelance meteorologist.

Minnesota Public Radio (MPR)

Mitchell's voice has also been heard on Minnesota Public Radio's Morning Edition since November 2019, in the role of meteorologist alongside anchor Cathy Wurzer.) On January 7, 2022, she announced on Twitter that she was leaving MPR to explore a candidacy for the Minnesota State Senate.

Political career
On January 24, 2022, a video of Nicole Mitchell was posted to YouTube announcing her candidacy for Minnesota State Senate District 47. A campaign website has been created.

She won in the 2022 general election against Republican candidate Dwight Dorau.

Personal
Mitchell is from Woodbury, Minnesota and graduated from Woodbury High School in 1992.  She is an alumna of the University of Minnesota.

On May 14, 2010, she received her Juris Doctor degree from the Georgia State University College of Law.

A strong believer in community service and volunteerism, Mitchell has in the past given her time in numerous capacities, including many years been a Big Sister for Big Brothers/Big Sisters, and as a Court Appointed Special Advocate (CASA) for abused and neglected children. She is currently a licensed foster care provider.

As a member of the Minnesota Bar, Mitchell volunteers her legal skills as part of "Wills For Heroes", which provides free wills and healthcare directives for first responders such as police officers, firefighters, and paramedics.

References

1974 births
Living people
Al Jazeera people
American television meteorologists
United States Air Force reservists
People from Fargo, North Dakota
Georgia State University alumni
University of Minnesota alumni